Fort Matachewan was a trading post set up by the Hudson's Bay Company in 1867, and is located 8 km north of the town of Matachewan, Ontario. This fort was primarily used for the fur trade, and as such the natives of the area often travelled to it to sell off their furs and pick up the staples of their diet. The fort was not a town site, but rather a large depot of stores. Eventually, a church was built on the grounds. Today the Fort is a crumbled relic of a time long past.

Affiliations
The museum is affiliated with: CMA,  CHIN, and Virtual Museum of Canada.

See also
 Chronology of the War of 1812
 War of 1812 Campaigns
 List of forts
 War of 1812
 Upper Canada

References

History museums in Canada
Matachewan
Hudson's Bay Company forts
1867 establishments in Ontario